Sutton Park is a housing development formed within Kilbarrack lands, on the coastline of Dublin Bay, Ireland.

Built on the site of an old sand quarry and neighbouring fields, it was constructed in the 1960s, a decade prior to the Bayside streets to the west, with which it is usually grouped. Located between the Dublin Area Rapid Transit (DART) line and the coastal Dublin Road, with access from Bayside Boulevard, Bayside Park and one external road link to the R105 coast road (itself a section of the Dublin-Howth-Holyhead-London road built by Thomas Telford in 1823).  Pedestrian access is also possible through Kilbarrack Cemetery, which stands between some of the Sutton Park streets and the sea.

Location and geography
Sutton Park is located in Fingal, north County Dublin,  from Dublin city centre. It is a low-density residential area, comprising multiple roads named Sutton Park as well as Sutton Lawns, Sutton Downs and Sutton Grove. The adjoining developments are Sarto / Roncalli, Verbena, Alden and Bayside Boulevards North and South.  To the east is a part of Baldoyle and then Sutton and Howth, while to the north is more of Baldoyle.

Sutton Park falls within the Dublin Bay North constituency.

Amenities
The area's amenities are concentrated in the central square of the Bayside development, and include a supermarket, mini-market, coffee shop, ice cream parlour, medical centre and a Roman Catholic church.

Media
The award-winning 2007 film, 32A, written and directed by Marian Quinn, was shot on location in Sutton Park and environs.

Notable residents
 John Carroll (trade unionist) (1925-2018), was involved in the formation of SIPTU through the amalgamation of the ITGWU and Federated Workers Union of Ireland. From the late 1950s, Carroll worked towards the creation of national bargaining mechanisms. He served almost 20 years on the executive of the Irish Congress of Trade Unions and was its president. He was also a Senator in the 15th Seanad.

References

Bayside, Dublin